Acquacanina is a frazione (hamlet) of the comune of Fiastra in the Province of Macerata in the Italian region Marche, located about  southwest of Ancona and about  southwest of Macerata. The municipal seat is in the frazione of Piè del Colle.

It was an autonomous comune until  31 December 2016.

Main sights
Santa Maria in Rio Sacro, Acquacanina  - Benedictine abbey church
Chiesa della Madonna del Vallone

See also
Monti Sibillini

References

Cities and towns in the Marche